General Reilly may refer to:

James W. Reilly (1828–1905), Union Army brigadier general
Jeremy Reilly (1934–2017), British Army lieutenant general
William Edward Moyses Reilly (1827–1886), British Army major general

See also
General Riley (disambiguation)